A talisman is an object which is purported to possess certain magical properties.

Talisman may also refer to:

Art and entertainment

Fictional characters
 Talisman (comics), a superhero from Marvel Comics who was a member of Alpha Flight
 Talisman, the player character from Ace Combat 6: Fires of Liberation

Films
 Talisman, the edited re-release title of the 1987 Italian film Cross of the Seven Jewels
 The Talisman, also known as King Richard and the Crusaders, a 1954 adaptation of the Scott novel

Fine arts 
 The Talisman (painting), a painting by French artist Paul Sérusier

Gaming 
 Talisman (board game), a board game from Games Workshop currently published by Fantasy Flight Games
 Talisman (video game), a 1985 video game based on the board game from Games Workshop

Literature
 Talisman (book series), a 2005 series of children's novels by Allan Frewin Jones
 Talisman: Sacred Cities, Secret Faith (2004), a non-fiction book by Graham Hancock and Robert Bauval
 The Talisman (Scott novel), an 1825 historical novel by Sir Walter Scott
 The Talisman (King and Straub novel), a 1984 fantasy novel by Stephen King and Peter Straub
 The Talisman (comics), a comic book adaptation of the above novel
 "The Talisman", a short story by South African author, Nadine Gordimer from the collection The Soft Voice of the Serpent (1952)

Stage works
 , an 1840 play by Johann Nestroy
 Der Talisman, an 1877 tragedy by Prince George of Prussia
 Der Talisman, an 1892 fantasy play by German Ludwig Fulda
 The Talisman (ballet), an 1889 opera
Der Talisman, a 1910 opera by British composer Adela Maddison

Music
 Talisman (band), a Swedish rock band
 Stanford Talisman, an American a cappella group from Stanford University
 Talisman (Alastair Galbraith album), 1995
 Talisman (Talisman album), 1990
 The Talisman, a song by Iron Maiden on their 2010 album The Final Frontier

Computing
 Microsoft Talisman, 3-D graphics architecture from Microsoft
 Talisman Desktop, a software desktop shell replacement for the Microsoft Windows operating system

Ships
 Talisman (ship), several ships with the name
 , the name of a number of British Royal Navy ships
 Talisman UUV, a multi-role unmanned underwater vehicle manufactured by BAE Systems
 Steamship Talisman,  a 73-foot, 40-ton, upper-cabin sternwheel steamboat built in 1961, and put on display at Lincoln's New Salem on the Sangamon River near Petersburg, Illinois until the early 1990s.

Other uses
 Talisman Energy, a Canadian oil-and-gas company
 Talisman, Cadillac Sixty Special Fleetwood Brougham sedan, built from 1974 to 1976
 Renault Talisman, a mid-size sedan built since 2015
 Talismán metro station, a Mexico City Metro station
 Talisman Centre, a Canadian multi-sports complex in Calgary, Alberta

See also
 Talismán (disambiguation)